Black birch is a common name for several trees, and may refer to:

 Asian black birch, the English name for Betula dahurica, tree species native to eastern Asia 
 Black birch, a common name for Betula lenta, tree species native to eastern North America, sometimes used to produce oil of wintergreen
 Black birch, a common name for Betula nigra, tree species native to the eastern United States